Kwesi Ahoomey-Zunu is a Togolese politician who was Prime Minister of Togo from July 2012 to June 2015. He was previously Minister of Trade from March 2011 to July 2012.

Biography 
Ahoomey-Zunu attended Tokoin High School, a district in Lomé. He holds a Master's degree in International Relations (International Relations Law) and degrees in Public Law and Planning.

He is a member of the Pan-African Patriotic Convergence (CPP) founded by Edem Kodjo. From 1988 to 1994, he was secretary of the National Commission for Human Rights (CNDH). From 1994 to 1999, Ahoomey-Zunu was a member of the National Assembly. From 1993 to 2005, he was a member of the Independent National Electoral Commission, 2000-2002, of which he was president. Ahoomey-Zuno was Minister of Territorial Administration from September 2006 to December 2007 in Yawovi Agboyibo's cabinet. From March 2011 to July 2012, he was Minister of Trade and Promotion of the Private Sector. From January 2008 to July 2012, he was Secretary General of the President.

Political career
Ahoomey-Zunu served as Minister of Territorial Administration and Secretary-General of the Presidency before being appointed as Minister of Trade and the Promotion of the Private Sector in March 2011. He remained in the latter post for over a year; he was then appointed as Prime Minister on 19 July 2012 following the resignation of Prime Minister Gilbert Houngbo. He took office on 23 July 2012.

Following the July 2013 parliamentary election, in which the ruling Union for the Republic (UNIR) won a large majority of seats, Ahoomey-Zunu was reappointed as Prime Minister. A new government headed by Ahoomey-Zunu was appointed on 17 September 2013. The size of the government was reduced from 31 members to 26.

Following President Faure Gnassingbé's re-election in the April 2015 presidential election, he appointed Komi Sélom Klassou to succeed Ahoomey-Zunu as Prime Minister on 5 June 2015. Klassou took office on 10 June 2015.

References

1958 births
Living people
Prime Ministers of Togo
Union for the Republic (Togo) politicians
21st-century Togolese politicians
21st-century Togolese people